Dave Rosenfield (June 13, 1929 – February 28, 2017) was an American Minor League Baseball executive. Rosenfield operated the Norfolk Tides. from the team's inception in 1963 until 2011; being named King of Baseball in 2004 and was inducted into the International League Hall of Fame in 2008 and the Virginia Sports Hall of Fame & Museum in April 2016.

Early life
Rosenfield was born in El Paso, Texas in 1929; moving with his family to California as a small child. He would then attend UCLA on a baseball scholarship and briefly signed with the Philadelphia Phillies before joining the U.S. Navy in 1951.

Career
Rosenfield served as General Manager of the Tidewater/Norfolk Tides for over 48 years, where after joining the team as assistant general manager in 1962; Rosenfield was promoted, starting the job in 1963 and holding it through the 2011 season. Following his departure in that capacity, Rosenfield remained an executive vice-president with the team while also serving as a color commentator on Tides' home games through 2016.

In this time he won four International League Executive of the Year Awards (1975, 1982, 1987, 1993). The Tides won 5 International League titles under him. Rosenfield also served as Vice President of the International League since 1977 and has been awarded the President's Trophy for most complete franchise in 1993, Baseball America Triple A Bob Freitas Award in 1994 and was named the 2004 "King of Baseball" where Minor League Baseball salutes a veteran from the world of professional baseball for long-time dedication and service to the game.

Other honors
He has been inducted into the Tidewater Shrine, their team Hall of Fame and in 2008 he was named to the International League Hall of Fame. Rosenfield affected more than just baseball in the Norfolk area; serving as interim GM of the ABA's Virginia Squires, and GM of the semi-pro football Norfolk Neptunes and the Southern Hockey Leagues Tidewater Sharks.

Additionally; a character was named after Rosenfield in the November 8, 1990 episode of The Simpsons titled "Dancin' Homer", which was penned by former Tides play-by-play broadcaster Ken Levine.

Personal life
Rosenfield, who had survived a bout with cancer that had spread to his bones in 2015 and once weighed as much as 380 pounds, suffered a heart attack in his home on February 18, 2017 and died from complications from the heart attack on February 28, 2017 at the age of 87. The Tides will wear a patch in his memory, featuring his face and nickname "Rosey" in the team's uniform font, in a black circle, during the 2017 season.

References

1929 births
2017 deaths
Minor league baseball executives